AFM Mohitul Islam was a Bangladesh Awami League activist and the personal assistant to the first president of Bangladesh, Sheikh Mujibur Rahman. He witnessed the Assassination of Sheikh Mujibur Rahman and filled the police case in this regard.

Career

Bangladesh Liberation War
Islam had fought in the Bangladesh Liberation war. He was a member of the Mujib Bahini. He surrendered his arms after the independence of Bangladesh. He joined the government of Bangladesh as an office branch assistant. While carrying files to the president from the chief secretary's office, he was liked by the president. He was transferred as the presidents personal assistant.

Assassination
On 15 August 1975, the President of Bangladesh Sheikh Mujibur Rahman was assassinated by a group of Bangladesh army officers. He was then the assistant to the president and the receptionist at his residence. He witnessed the assassination. In October 1976 he tried to file a case at the Lalbagh Police Station. He was assaulted by on-duty police officers as the assassins were still in power. He was able to file the case on 2 October 1996 when Sheikh Mujib's Awami League. The verdict in the case came in November 2009. The Awami League government nullified the idemnity act which protected the assassins from prosecution. Five of the convicted assassins were executed in January 2010.

Post assassination 
Islam was injured in the assassination attempt, he fled the hospital to his village home is Jessore but was captured by the army. He was tortured in custody. Sheikh Mujib's APS Shahriar ZR Iqbal had helped Islam get released from custody. He continued his government job, becoming the Director at Directorate of Relief. He was removed from his office in 2002 after the Bangladesh Nationalist Party-Jamaat-I-Islami alliance came to power.

Death
He died on 25 August 2016 in Bangabandhu Sheikh Mujib Medical University, Dhaka, Bangladesh. He was buried in Kashimpur, Manirampur, Jessore.

References

Awami League politicians
2016 deaths
People from Jessore District